Israel García may refer to:
 Israel García (footballer, born 1999), Mexican footballer
 Israel García (footballer, born 2004), Spanish footballer
 Israel Garcia (boxer) (born 1970), Puerto Rican boxer